Lords of the Bow (known as Genghis: Lords of the Bow in America) is the second book of the Conqueror series, based on the life of Mongol warlord Genghis Khan by Conn Iggulden. The book follows Genghis' completion of the consolidation of the disparate Mongol tribes and subsequent campaigns against the Western Xia and Jin empires.

Plot summary

Under the name Genghis, the protagonist unites the Mongol tribes, finally defeating the last alliance against his rule. After the killing of the Khan of the alliance, the defeated shaman decides to tie his fate to that of the new Mongol nation.

Genghis orders all of the tribes to assemble the following summer in the pastures around the Black Mountain.

The following summer sees the tribes gathered, waiting for Genghis to lead them where he will. They are anxious to be off, but he is determined to wait for the Khan of the Uighur to show up with the five thousand soldiers he wishes to have. While stuck in one place, the new Nation becomes impatient and tempers flare. In one incident, Genghis' brother Khasar is forced to defend his honour against the sons of a lesser Khan. He is helped by the young Tsubodai, who is rewarded later in the book. When his brother, Temuge, tries to intervene, he is forced to his knees. Genghis shows up on the scene, and tries to sort out the situation. Almost everyone has their honour satisfied, except for Temuge, who complains that he was made to kneel. Genghis uses his sword to cut the Khan's thighs, so he cannot stand in return.

Close to the end of the summer, the Uighurs arrive. Their Khan submits privately to Genghis, which is taken as even more binding than the public oaths the entire Mongol nation takes under a ceremony presided over by the shaman. As the price for this support, Genghis promises the Khan of the Uighars that he will march against the Xia, and the Uighars will receive the assorted libraries of the conquered people. As well as military support, Genghis negotiates that his shaman and his brother Temuge be taught to read and write.

The entire Mongol nation then begins to march southwards, to take the kingdom of the Xia. Facing them is the arduous crossing of the Gobi desert.

Having crossed the desert the Mongol hordes attempt to take the kingdom of Xi Xia, the Mongols inexperience in siege craft shows when they are held at bay by the walls of Xi Xia, the division between the kingdom of Xi Xia and the Chin empire is also highlighted at this time. Eventually the Xia kingdom capitulates and Genghis wins a princess of the city as his bride as well as many other spoils of war.

From this point on, there is tension between Borte (Genghis' first wife) and Genghis' second wife. Also highlighted in this book is Genghis' estrangement from his eldest son Jochi (whose legitimacy Genghis doubts) and the strife within Genghis' family that this estrangement causes.

Khasar and Temuge are also featured greatly in this book as they take a trip with a captured Xi Xia officer down the Yellow River to a Chin city to find masons to help them break city walls. On their adventures they come across the leader of the Blue Tong (a criminal fraternity), who helps Ghengis' brothers in exchange for a promise that he will be leader of his city after it is conquered by the Mongols.

Another character of note introduced in this book is Kokchu, a shaman who smells of blood and is very self-serving. He gains Genghis' trust and starts to teach Temuge the ways of a Shaman. During the course of Temuge's lessons, he becomes addicted to Opium, which Kokchu provides for him.

Historical Accuracy

The source material for the book is The Secret History of the Mongols. As with the Emperor series before it, Iggulden sometimes strays from historical sources for the purpose of storytelling. Some of the differences are described in an author's note at the end of the book.

2008 British novels
Conqueror (novel series)
Novels set in the 13th century
Novels set in Mongol Empire
HarperCollins books